Mola Adebisi (born 15 February 1973 as Ademola Oluwatosin Adebisi) in Uelzen, Lower Saxony, West Germany is a German TV presenter, actor, dubbing actor, singer, dancer and amateur racer.

Life
Mola Adebis was born in Uelzen to parents from Nigeria. He grew up in Solingen. From 1993 to 2004, he was a presenter of a number of shows on the music television channel VIVA Germany. He now lives in Solingen.

Filmography

As actor 
 1995: Jede Menge Leben
 1996: Der Trip – Die nackte Gitarre 0,5
 1996 - 1997: Marienhof
 1997: Einsatz Hamburg Süd
 1999: alphateam – Die Lebensretter im OP
 1999: Sieben Tage bis zum Glück
 2008: Falco: Damn It, We're Still Alive!
 2011: Alarm für Cobra 11 – Die Autobahnpolizei

As dubbing actor 
 2002: Ali G in da House
 2004: Große Haie – Kleine Fische

Discography
 1996 – Shake that Body
 1997 – Get It Right (mit Sqeezer & Bed & Breakfast)
 1997 – Don't Give Up

External links

German male television actors
German male film actors
1973 births
Living people
People from Solingen
German people of Nigerian descent
20th-century German male actors
21st-century German male actors
Ich bin ein Star – Holt mich hier raus! participants